This is a list of Japanese composers, ordered by birth date.

Shōka, Lied, Children's song 
 Isawa Shūji (1851-1917)
 Sakunosuke Koyama (1864-1927)
 Teiichi Okano (1878-1941)
 Rentarō Taki (1879–1903)
 Tadashi Yanada (1883–1959)
 Nagayo Motoori (1885-1945)
 Kōsaku Yamada (1886–1965)
 Shinpei Nakayama (1887-1952)
 Ryūtarō Hirota (1892-1952)
 Tamezō Narita (1893-1945)
 Kan'ichi Shimofusa (1898-1962)
 Yūji Koseki (1909-1989)
 Yoshinao Nakada (1923-2000)

Classical and Contemporary

Others 
 Yatsuhashi Kengyo (1614–1685)
 Hiromori Hayashi (1831–1896)
 Nakao Tozan (1876-1956)
 Koga Masao (1904-1978)
 Masaru Sato (1928-1999)
 Shunsuke Kikuchi (1931-2021), 20th-21st-century music producer and BGM composer
 Koichi Sugiyama (1931-2021)
 Isao Tomita (1932-2016)
 Takeo Watanabe (1933-1989)
 Yasuo Kuwahara (1946–2003)
 Joe Hisaishi (born 1950), 20th-21st century film composer
 Ryuichi Sakamoto (born 1952)
 Shirō Sagisu (born 1957)
 Yoichiro Yoshikawa (born 1957), 20th-21st century music producer and composer
 Jun Miyake (born 1958)
 Nobuo Uematsu (born 1959), 20th-21st century musician and video game composer
 Akira Senju (born 1960)
 Koji Kondo (born 1961), 20th-21st century video game composer
 Michiru Oshima (born 1961), 20th-21st century film, television and video game composer
 Michiru Yamane (born 1963), 20th-21st century video game composer
 Hikari Ōe (born 1963)
 Shinkichi Mitsumune (born 1963)
 Yoko Kanno (born 1963), 20th-21st century music producer and composer
 Yuki Kajiura (born 1965), 20th-21st century music producer and composer
 Taro Iwashiro (born 1965)
 Yoshiki Hayashi (born 1965), 20th-21st century music producer and composer
 Yoko Shimomura (born 1967), 20th-21st century music pianist and video game composer
 Yasunori Mitsuda (born 1972)
 Hiroyuki Sawano (born 1980), 20th-21st century animation, film, television and video game composer

See also
Japan Composer's Association

References

 
Japanese
Composers